Sun Lakes is an unincorporated community and census-designated place (CDP) in Maricopa County, Arizona, United States. The population was 14,868 at the 2020 census. Sun Lakes is an active adult community comprising five country club communities in three homeowner associations. These include the gated communities of Oakwood and IronWood (IronOaks), the gated and non-gated communities of Palo Verde and Cottonwood (Cottonwood Palo Verde), and the non-gated community of Sun Lakes 1. Sun Lakes is a master-planned community developed by Robson Communities.

Geography
Sun Lakes is located along the southeastern border of Maricopa County at  (33.214686, -111.869966). It is bordered to the north and east by the city of Chandler and to the south by unincorporated Goodyear Village in Pinal County.

Demographics

At the 2000 census there were 11,936 people, 6,683 households, and 4,798 families in the CDP. The racial makeup of the CDP was 98.4% White, 0.8% Black or African American, 0.1% Native American, 0.3% Asian, <0.1% Pacific Islander, 0.1% from other races, and 0.3% from two or more races.  0.9% of the population were Hispanic or Latino of any race.
Of the 6,683 households 0.1% had children under the age of 18 living with them, 69.5% were married couples living together, 1.8% had a female householder with no husband present, and 28.2% were non-families. 25.8% of households were one person and 20.6% were one person aged 65 or older.  The average household size was 1.79 and the average family size was 2.06.

The age distribution was 0.2% under the age of 18, 0.3% from 18 to 24, 2.1% from 25 to 44, 31.3% from 45 to 64, and 66.2% 65 or older.  The median age was 69 years. For every 100 females, there were 82.6 males.  For every 100 females age 18 and over, there were 82.6 males.

The median household income was $43,634 and the median family income  was $50,333. Males had a median income of $46,250 versus $35,350 for females. The per capita income for the CDP was $33,394.  About 2.0% of families and 2.8% of the population were below the poverty line, including none of those under age 18 and 3.0% of those age 65 or over.

References

External links
 Sun Lakes of Arizona community resources site for residents and visitors
 Robson Resort Communities

Census-designated places in Maricopa County, Arizona
Phoenix metropolitan area
Retirement communities